Materials Science and Engineering: A — Structural Materials: Properties, Microstructure and Processing is a peer-reviewed scientific journal. It is the section of Materials Science and Engineering dedicated to "theoretical and experimental studies related to the load-bearing capacity of materials as influenced by their basic properties, processing history, microstructure and operating environment" and is published monthly by Elsevier. Current editor-in-chief is E. J. Lavernia (University of California Irvine).

Abstracting and indexing
The journal is indexed and abstracted in the following bibliographic databases:

According to the Journal Citation Reports, the journal has a 2021 impact factor of 6.004, ranking 9th out of 79 in the category 'Metallurgy & Metallurgical Engineering'.

References

External links
 

Physics review journals
Materials science journals
Elsevier academic journals
Publications established in 1993
English-language journals
Monthly journals